A gold leaf is a thin gold foil used for decoration.

Gold leaf or Goldleaf may also refer to:

Gold Leaf Award, a precursor of the Juno Awards
Gold-leaf electroscope, a historical scientific instrument
Gold Leaf (TV series), 2021 Taiwanese television series